Brad Gobright (June 16, 1988 November 27, 2019) was an American rock climber known for free solo climbing.

Early life
Gobright was born in Orange County, California, and began climbing when he was six. He dropped out of college in 2009, working odd jobs during winter and climbing during the rest of the year.

Climbing career
Gobright and Mason Earle made the first free ascent of The Heart Route on El Capitan in Yosemite National Park in 2015. In 2016, he and Scott Bennett climbed three routes on El Capitan in 24 hours Zodiac, The Nose and Lurking Fear. In 2017, he and Jim Reynolds set a speed record of two hours 19 minutes and 44 seconds for The Nose on El Capitan. With Alex Honnold in June 2019, he made the second free ascent of El Niño on El Capitan in fourteen-and-a-half hours.

The accident happened while simul-rappelling down the face of El Sendero Luminoso with his partner Aidan Jacobson, after the pair had completed a quick climb of the face. Jacobson fell a shorter distance and survived with injuries. It was reported that the two men were simul-rappelling, a technique in which two climbers descend opposite strands of an anchored rope, with their bodies acting as counterweights to each other.

Filmography 
Safety Third (2017) – A segment in Sender Films' Reel Rock 12, the 27-minute documentary shows Gobright's bold trad and free solo climbs including his free solo ascent of Hairstyles and Attitudes (5.12b/c) on the Bastille, Eldorado Canyon, Colorado.
Two Nineteen Forty-Four (2017) – The 8-minute film shows Brad Gobright and Jim Reynolds's October 2017 speed record of 2 hours, 19 minutes, and 44 seconds on The Nose, a route up El Capitan in Yosemite, California.
The Nose Speed Record'''' (2019) – Featured in Reel Rock 14, the 63-minute documentary features Alex Honnold and Tommy Caldwell's successful effort to beat Brad Gobright and Jim Reynolds's speed record on The Nose of El Capitan. Brad Gobright and Jim Reynolds's previous speed record was 2 hours, 19 minutes, and 44 seconds. The new speed record set by Honnold and Caldwell was 1 hour, 58 minutes, and 7 seconds. The documentary shows footage of both teams' climbs and the friendly rivalry between them.

 Selected notable climbs 
2015, The Heart Route (VI 5.13b) El Capitan, Yosemite, US – First free ascent by Brad Gobright and Mason Earle on June 19, 2015.
2015, Hairstyles and Attitudes (5.12c) in Eldorado Canyon, Colorado, US – First free solo ascent by Brad Gobright in November 2015.
2017, The Nose (VI 5.8 A2) El Capitan, Yosemite, US – Former speed record of 2 hours, 19 minutes, and 44 seconds set by Brad Gobright and Jim Reynolds in October 2017.
2019, Golden Gate (VI 5.13), Muir Wall via The Shaft, El Nino via Pineapple Express, El Capitan, Yosemite, US – Brad Gobright has sent Golden Gate VI 5.13a in a 16.5 hour push for his third free route on El Cap this season in a day. Earlier this spring, Gobright sent Muir Wall via The Shaft and El Nino via Pineapple Express''.

References 

1988 births
2019 deaths
American rock climbers
Free soloists
Mountaineering deaths
Sport deaths in Mexico
Sportspeople from Orange County, California